A Long Way from Chicago is a "novel in stories" (or short story cycle) by Richard Peck.

Plot 
"Shotgun Cheatham's" Last Night Above Ground - 1929" (originally printed in Twelve Shots: Stories About Guns, 1997). The first summer the children go to their grandmother's house, a reporter comes looking for info on the infamous man who has just died, Shotgun Cheatham. Grandma holds an open house for Shotgun and lies to the reporter by saying he was a war hero. Grandma's enemy, Effie Wilcox, comes too but then the coffin begins to move. Grandma shoots the coffin with her shotgun, while Ms. Wilcox and the reporter run out, but it turns out that it was the cat that lives in the cobb house who moved the curtain draped over the coffin.

"The Mouse in the Milk" - 1930." The next summer, the Cowgill boys are tormenting the town by blowing up Grandma's mailbox or Effie Wilcox's privy. Grandma tells one of the boys she won't be home for her daily milk delivery, knowing the boys would try to steal something from her. That night she turns the lights off and waits for them to come and steal; she catches them and has Joey get their parents. Grandma tells Mr. Cowgill that if his boys won't stop she'll tell everyone that she found a mouse in her milk, running his business to the ground.

"A One-Woman Crime Wave" - 1931". Grandma uses illegal fish traps to get catfish from the lake while using the sheriff's boat she stole to feed to drifters and sees the sheriff's deputies while fishing but they seem too intoxicated to understand the situation.

"The Day of Judgment" - 1932". Grandma's gooseberry pie goes up against Rupert Pennypacker's in a pie baking contest at the fair for her town's honor and a flight in a biplane. Grandma switches the nameplates on the pies at the last minute. Rupert Pennypacker wins the contest with Grandma's pie, but Grandma still finds a way to get Joey a ride in an airplane.

"The Phantom Brakeman" - 1933". While Mary Alice is recently idolizing a tap dancer and film actress Shirley Temple, mismatched families of local lovers converge on Grandma's house and she uses an old ghost story to aid them. At night time Vandalia Eubanks and Junior Stubbs run away together with the help of "The Phantom Brakeman" (Joey) and Grandma.

"Things with Wings" - 1934". While Joey is having a love affair with a Hudson Terraplane 8 (a new car model), Grandma is finding a way to force banker Mr. Weidenbach to return Mrs. Effie Wilcox to her foreclosed home with rumors of Abe Lincoln.

"Centennial Summer" - 1935". There's a centennial celebration that is celebrated every century in town and Grandma has a showdown with Mrs. Weidenbach about whose family has the most talent and the county's oldest living veteran.

"The Troop Train" - 1942". Joey joins the army air corps because he loves airplanes. He sends a telegram to Grandma telling her that he was passing through her town. When the train comes by, Joey sees Grandma's house lit up and Grandma herself waving to each and every car passing by, hoping that he would see her, too. Joey waves back and goes off to fight in World War II.

 Reception 
It was awarded the Newbery Honor in 1999. Peck's sequel to this book, A Year Down Yonder, won the Newbery Medal for children's literature in 2001. Matt Berman from Common Sense Media rated A Long Way from Chicago five stars. Kirkus Reviews described the book as a "wry tale ranging from humorous to poignant". In 2012 it was ranked number 67 on a list of the top 100 children's novels published by School Library Journal''.

Citations 

1998 American novels
1998 children's books
American children's novels
Children's historical novels
Newbery Honor-winning works
Novels set in Illinois